"The Winter of His Content" is the fourteenth episode of the twenty-fifth season of the American animated television series The Simpsons and the 544th episode of the series. It first aired on the Fox network in the United States on March 16, 2014. It was written by Kevin Curran and directed by Chuck Sheetz. In the episode, when the Retirement Castle is closed for health violations, Marge invites Grampa and two other old people to live at the Simpsons' house, only to get frustrated with Homer embracing the "old person lifestyle". Meanwhile, Bart defends Nelson's decision to wear his mother's underwear, and ends up part of a bully gathering in an homage to the 1979 action film The Warriors.

Plot
Marge and Homer are in the throes of full passion as they arrive home from a date, but all romance is out the window when Lisa tells them that the Springfield Retirement Castle has been shut down for massive violations and Grampa has nowhere to live. When Grampa is picked up by the family, Marge sees that Grampa's friends Jasper Beardley and the Old Jewish Man have no one to pick them up, and she invites them to stay with them as well, much to the rest of the family's dismay.

With Grampa and his friends endlessly passing gas, reading huge-font online articles and needing constant defibrillation which drives up the electric bills, Homer's complaints about the old men lead Lisa to quietly but seriously point out that she and Bart are getting cues on how they will take care of Homer when he is older, and while Lisa is shocked when Homer reveals that Grampa's father is alive but Grampa ignores him, Lisa just asks her dad to be nice to Grampa, who she calls a "treasure". Homer's efforts to be nice and helpful to Grampa and his friends leads to him surprisingly enjoying the senior citizen lifestyle of early breakfasts, mall-walking and bingo, and they induct Homer into their "club". Unfortunately, Homer's appreciation for all things elderly irritates Marge, and she sadly tells Patty and Selma that while she did not mind when he got bald and then increasingly fat, she never expected or wanted him to act older than her.

Meanwhile, at school, Bart and his classmates undress for gym class. Nelson reluctantly changes, but his fellow school students laugh at him when they find out he is wearing his mother's hand-me-down underwear. The laughter does not cease until Bart points out he is wearing Homer's hand-me-down briefs, which were previously worn by gorillas performing for circuses. The class, including Nelson, is moved by Bart's kind act. As a thanks to Bart for standing up for him, Nelson and the other bullies Dolph, Kearney, and Jimbo induct Bart into their ranks at an abandoned country club.

The group head to a meeting at the Bully Summit held at Krustyland by Chester, the leader of all bullies. All bullies are required to turn in their weapons, but Bart gets sidetracked and forgets to turn in his slingshot. When an elder, more rebellious bully uses Bart's slingshot during Chester's speech, the guilty bully blames Bart and he, Nelson, Dolph, Kearney, and Jimbo try to get back to Springfield without getting beaten or killed by all the enraged gang members. The five finally make it back to the subway, but the Baseball Furries are there waiting. Bart uses his slingshot to break the street light and distract them. One stays behind, however and Nelson sacrifices himself for the others.

The four boys make it back to the Springfield beach just as the sun is rising, where Homer and the old men just so happen to be taking a stroll. Homer sees his son is in trouble and wants his new/old friends to help, but they demur in cowardly fashion. So Homer confronts the enemy bully and punches him before he can hurt Bart. In a flash, the bully begins crying and says he has never actually been in a fight and runs off with his allies while Bart, Homer, and their crews walk slowly along the beach back home.

That night, Homer returns to normal and has passionate sex with Marge during the ten minutes they have between the kids sleeping and the old guys awakening.

Reception
Dennis Perkins of The A.V. Club gave the episode a C, stating "’The Winter Of His Content’ is the quintessential Simpsons episode for those seeking to argue the series’ late-run inconsequence. While there’s nothing less insightful than saying the show isn’t what it used to be, episodes like this are nothing but fuel for the argument—indifferent, lukewarm fuel."

The episode received a 1.9 rating and was watched by a total of 4.02 million people, making it the second most watched show on Animation Domination that night.

References

External links 
 
 "The Winter of His Content" at theSimpsons.com

2014 American television episodes
The Simpsons (season 25) episodes